Jabaquara Atlético Clube, or simply Jabaquara, is a Brazilian football team based in Santos, São Paulo. Founded in 1914, it plays in Campeonato Paulista Segunda Divisão.

History
Jabaquara Atlético Clube was founded on November 15, 1914 by Spanish immigrants as Hespanha Foot Ball Club. The club played their first game against Clube Afonso XIII, which were another club founded by Spanish immigrants. The game ended in 1–1 draw. The club were forced by the Brazilian government to change their name to Jabaquara Atlético Clube during World War II. They changed their name on November 7, 1942.

They closed their football department in 2001, reopening it in the following year. Jabaquara won the Campeonato Paulista Série A3 in 1993, and the Campeonato Paulista Série B3 in 2002.

Stadium
Jabaquara play their home games at Estádio Espanha. The stadium has a maximum capacity of 8,031 people.

Achievements

 Campeonato Paulista:
 Runners-up (2): 1927 (LAF), 1934 (FPF)
 Campeonato Paulista Série A2:
 Winners (1): 1927
 Campeonato Paulista Série A3:
 Winners (1): 1993
 Campeonato Paulista Série B3:
 Winners (1): 2002

References

External links 
 Official Website
 Jabaquara AC at Facebook
 Jabaquara AC at YouTube
 Jabaquara AC at Instagram

Association football clubs established in 1914
Football clubs in São Paulo (state)
1914 establishments in Brazil